This article provides a list of Mayors and Councillors elected to Calgary City Council, the governing body for the city of Calgary, Alberta, Canada.

Length of term

The first municipal election in Calgary took place in 1884 where Mayor George Murdoch and four councillors were elected to serve as Calgary's first council. Mayor and Councillors were elected for one year terms annually from 1884 until 1912, after which Councillors were elected to serve staggered two year terms. In 1923, the length of term for a Mayor was extended to two years to match the period for councillors. In 1971 the term for Mayor and Councillors was extended from two years, to three years and provisions related to staggered election of Councillors were removed. In 2013, amendments to the Local Authorities Election Act extended the term for the Mayor and Councillors to four years.

Electoral wards

The Mayor of Calgary has always been elected at-large by the electors of the city.

Calgary became a town in 1884. In the early history of Calgary from 1884 to 1888, three Councillors were elected at-large by all electors, then from 1888 to 1893, six Councillors were elected. 

Following the passage of the Calgary Charter (Ordinance 33 of 1893), which provided "City" status to Calgary, the Councillors were elected to represent wards of the City.

From 1894 to 1904, the City was divided into three wards, each represented by three Councillors, for a total of nine Councillors. 

Council expanded in 1905 with the introduction of a fourth ward, which also received three Councillors, for a total of 12 Councillors. with the structure remaining in place until 1912. 

The ward system was eliminated in 1913, and a City Council consisting of twelve Councillors were elected at-large from 1914 to 1960, half of them up for election each time (with exceptions).

In 1961, the City was divided into six wards with two Councillors elected for each ward. In 1977 the City was divided into fourteen wards with one Councillor elected to represent each ward, which has remained the structure of Calgary City Council to the present date.

Other elected officials

During the 1910s, and 1920s the residents elected City Commissioners, which were in charge of the Administration of the municipality. School board elections are also held in line with city council elections. Hospital boards were also elected in various city elections in Calgary.

Methods of voting

From 1906 to 1914, the 12 councillors were elected in four wards, three to each ward. Aldermanic elections were held yearly, using block voting (each voter had as many votes as there were seats to fill.

In 1914, Calgary moved to at-large elections with the city as one large district.

In 1917 Calgary brought in a system of Proportional Representation, under which city councillors were elected at-large using Single Transferable Voting (STV) and one multiple-member district covering the whole city. (The mayor was elected through Instant-runoff voting.) This survived until 1961. This system is said to have produced the emergence and increased representation of neighbourhood or community-based political groups.

In 1961, Calgary switched to a ward system in which multiple city councillors were elected in each ward using STV, in 1961 and 1971.

For other elections held from 1962 to 1970,councillors sat in staggered terms, with usually only one in each ward up for election each time. The elections in between were held according to Alternative Voting in which one councillor was elected in each ward.

After 1961, in the subsequent elections, staggered terms meant only one councillor was elected each election in each ward each year. That plus the retention of single transferable voting meant Alternative Voting, instead of Single Transferable Vote (STV). (Two times there were two vacancies in a ward due to resignation or other cause and multi-winner STV was used)

Previous to 1971 election, terms of aldermanic service were extended to three years, and all ward seats were elected simultaneously in 1971, through Single Transferable Vote. This was Calgary's last election held using Single Transferable Vote, and would be the last one in Canada up to the present.

Title of elected officials

From 1884 to 2010 the title for elected officials  on Calgary City Council excluding the Mayor, was Alderman, although Councillor was used interchangeably during that period. On December 14, 2010, council voted to change the title to councillor, which took effect in the October 2013 election.

List of Calgary Municipal Elections 1884-Present

See also 
Calgary City Council
List of mayors of Calgary

Notes

References

External References
Frederick Hunter: THE MAYORS AND COUNCILS  OF  THE CORPORATION OF CALGARY Archived March 3, 2020

 
Elections, Municipal